CTSI-Global is a Memphis-based firm that provides freight-invoice processing and related supply chain management technology and consulting services. CEO J. Kenneth Hazen acquired the company in 1982. Since that time, the firm has evolved from a manual freight bill audit and payment operation into a producer of logistics-focused business intelligence services.

Core Services 
Freight payment processing
Business intelligence
Transportation Management System (TMS)
Consulting 
Audit and analysis
Contract management and cost allocation

Awards 
Top 100 Logistics IT Provider. Inbound Logistics, multiple years
Top 100 3PL Provider. Inbound Logistics, multiple years
World's Greatest Logistics IT. How2Media, 2013
Social Madness national competition. American City Business Journals: Memphis medium business winner, 2012
Company of the Year. Memphis Business Journal: large business award, 2006; small business award, 1985
Inc. 500. Inc., 1988

See also 
Electronic Data Interchange

References 

Logistics companies of the United States
Business services companies established in 1957
Companies based in Memphis, Tennessee
Privately held companies based in Tennessee
Supply chain software companies
1957 establishments in Tennessee